Surangel and Sons Company was a Palauan association football club which first competed in the Palau Soccer League, the top level league in Palau, in 2006, when they were crowned champions. They competed in the following season as well, finishing runner up, losing 2–1 to Team Bangladesh in the final, having topped the qualifying group. Due to fragmentary records, it is not known in how many other seasons they competed.

Players

2006/2007 Squad

References

Football clubs in Palau
Works association football teams